Events from the year 1859 in Ireland.

Events
 29 March – The Irish Times is first published, in Dublin.
 28 April–18 May – United Kingdom general election in Ireland produces a Tory majority in Irish seats.
 30 April – American ship Pomona carrying, mainly Irish, emigrants from Liverpool to New York, is wrecked on a sandbank at Ballyconigar, off Wexford, with 424 deaths and only 24 survivors.
 Evangelical Ulster Revival.
 John Sisk establishes his building construction business in Cork.

Births
3 January – Maurice Healy, lawyer, politician and MP (died 1923).
30 January – Tony Mullane, Major League Baseball player (died 1944).
1 February – Victor Herbert, composer, cellist and conductor (died 1924).
11 February – Barry Yelverton, 5th Viscount Avonmore, nobleman and officer (died 1885).
February – James Murray, recipient of the Victoria Cross for gallantry in 1881 at Elandsfontein, near Pretoria, South Africa (died 1942).
13 April – Daniel Gallery, politician in Canada (died 1920).
22 April – Ada Rehan, Shakespearean actress (died 1916 in the United States).
4 May – William Hamilton, cricketer (died 1914).
16 October – Daisy Bates, née Margaret Dwyer, anthropologist (died 1951 in Australia).
Full date unknown
Francis Fitzpatrick, recipient of the Victoria Cross for gallantry in 1879 during an attack on Sekukuni's Town, South Africa (died 1933).
Thomas Houghton, Anglican Clergyman and editor of the Gospel Magazine (died 1951).
Edward Martyn, playwright and activist (died 1923).
Justin Huntly McCarthy, politician and author (died 1936).
Walter Osborne, painter (died 1903).
Henry Jones Thaddeus, painter (died 1929).

Deaths
14 April – Lady Morgan, novelist (b. c1776).
3 November – George Forrest, recipient of the Victoria Cross for gallantry during the Indian Rebellion of 1857 at Delhi, India (born 1800).
29 April – Dionysius Lardner, scientific writer (born 1793).
Full date unknown
Peter McManus, Irish recipient of the Victoria Cross.

References

 
1850s in Ireland
Years of the 19th century in Ireland
Ireland, 1859 In
 Ireland